Behrouz Rahbar (23 September 1945 – 22 March 2019) was an Iranian cyclist. He competed in three events at the 1972 Summer Olympics according to sports-reference.org and according to the-sports.org he rode in addition the men's sprint event. He also won gold medal in the 1974 Asian Games in Tehran.

References

External links
 

1945 births
2019 deaths
Iranian male cyclists
Olympic cyclists of Iran
Cyclists at the 1972 Summer Olympics
Place of birth missing
Asian Games gold medalists for Iran
Asian Games bronze medalists for Iran
Asian Games medalists in cycling
Cyclists at the 1974 Asian Games
Medalists at the 1974 Asian Games
20th-century Iranian people